Tauraria is an atoll in Fiji, a member of the Ringgold Isles archipelago, which forms an outlier group to the northern island of Vanua Levu. The uninhabited islet is around 40m north of Qelelevu, and 0.9 km east of Vetauua. Tauraria  is a low, upraised and jagged limestone islet covered in dense but scrubby bush. There is a significant population of breeding seabird colonies  on Tauraria, especially black-naped terns.

See also

 Desert island
 List of islands

References

Uninhabited islands of Fiji
Ringgold Isles